Saitkulovo (Säyetqol) is a rural locality (a village) in Ishkarovsky Selsoviet, Ilishevsky District, Bashkortostan, Russia. The population was 218 as of 2010. There are 2 streets.

Geography 
Saitkulovo is located 19 km east of Verkhneyarkeyevo (the district's administrative centre) by road. Ishkarovo is the nearest rural locality.

References 

Rural localities in Ilishevsky District